Iacob Pistiner (1882 – 24 August 1930) was a Romanian politician and lawyer.

He was born in Chernivtsi, Bukovina, 1882, then part of Austro-Hungarian Empire, in a Jewish family. As a result of the general election of May–June, 1920, in Greater Romania, he was elected member of the parliament, defeating the German candidate by a majority of only 30 votes.

His political career was tied with the socialist movement. In 1917, he joined Mayer Ebner  in establishing the Jewish National Council in Chernivtsi. As a lawyer he pleaded for the defendants in the "Trial of the 500" that followed the important 1924 Tatarbunary Uprising.

He died unexpectedly in 1930 in Bucharest, aged 49.

References

External links
 Jacob Pistiner (1882 - 1930)

1882 births
1930 deaths
20th-century Romanian lawyers
Romanian Social Democratic Party (1927–1948) politicians
Jewish Romanian politicians
Jewish socialists
Members of the Chamber of Deputies (Romania)
Members of the Executive of the Labour and Socialist International